Maryan Nuh Muse (born January 1, 1997) is a Somali sprinter. She competed at the 2016 Summer Olympics in the women's 400 metres race; her time of 1:10.14 in the heats.
Prior to the Olympics, she competed at the 2014 Youth Olympic Games and her training was in a stadium in Mogadishu. She believes Somali athletes' are working hard for the next summer olympics

References

1997 births
Living people
Somalian female sprinters
Olympic athletes of Somalia
Athletes (track and field) at the 2016 Summer Olympics
Athletes (track and field) at the 2014 Summer Youth Olympics
Olympic female sprinters